The John F. Cox Grammar School (also known as the John F. Cox Elementary School) is a historic school in Lakeland, Florida. It is located at 1005-1021 North Massachusetts Avenue. On July 22, 1999, it was added to the U.S. National Register of Historic Places.

Gallery

References

 Polk County listings at National Register of Historic Places
 John F. Cox Grammar School at Portal of Historic Resources, State of Florida

External links

Schools in Lakeland, Florida
National Register of Historic Places in Polk County, Florida
1928 establishments in Florida
Educational institutions established in 1928